Elizabeth Banks CBE (born 1941), is a retired British landscape architect specializing in the restoration of historic landscapes who served as the first woman president of the Royal Horticultural Society from 2010 to 2013. She was appointed a CBE for services to horticulture in 2017.

Royal Horticultural Society 
In 1987, Banks designed Rosemoor Gardens for the RHS. Banks served as president of the Royal Horticultural Society from 2010 to 2013. She was the first professional horticulturalist to hold this position. She succeeded Giles Coode-Adams, who had held the position from 20082010.

Hergest Croft Gardens 
Elizabeth Banks and her husband, Lawrence, managed Hergest Croft Gardens from 19882010, when their younger son, Edward, took over. During this time, they designed and planted the Maple Grove, as well as other exotic trees. They now live at Ridgebourne, in Herefordshire.

References

External links 

 Hergest Croft Gardens in Kington, Herefordshire within the Welsh Marshes

Commanders of the Order of the British Empire
Living people
British landscape architects
1941 births
British women architects